Chal Sarun (also Romanized as Chāl Sarūn; also known as Chāl Sarā) is a village in Firuzjah Rural District, Bandpey-ye Sharqi District, Babol County, Mazandaran Province, Iran. At the 2006 census, its population was 28, in 8 families.

References 

Populated places in Babol County